is a volcanic island in the Sea of Japan, 12 km from the coast of the Shimane prefecture in Japan. Takashima Island is administered as part of Masuda, Shimane Prefecture. Takashima takes its name, meaning "High Island" from its steep cliffs and mountains. The island was inhabited since at least 15th century, but was completely depopulated twice - in 1711 and 1975, when all inhabitants left the island following a natural disasters. Currently (as in 2017) it is used as a fishing spot.

See also

 This article incorporates material from Japanese Wikipedia page 高島 (島根県), accessed 5 January 2017
 Desert island
 List of islands

References

Islands of Shimane Prefecture
Islands of the Sea of Japan
Uninhabited islands of Japan